Ulfe may refer to the following rivers in Hesse, Germany:

Ulfe (Fulda), tributary of the Fulda
Ulfe (Sontra), tributary of the Sontra

See also

Uelfe, alternative spelling Ülfe, a river of North Rhine-Westphalia, Germany, tributary of the Wupper